Gjon  (definite form: Gjoni) is an Albanian male given name, clan, surname and onomastic element.

As given name

Etymology and history
Gjon as a given name is a form of the English name John. It is the name of the apostle Saint John in Albanian. Most saint names in Albanian come from Latin;  John is from the Latin Iohannes, the Latin form of the  Greek Ioannes, derived from the Hebrew name Yohanan, meaning "God is gracious". Both theologists and linguists are unsure about the relationship of the name Gjon to Gjin—the Catholic clergy considers the two to be the same saint, but the Christians of the Central Albanian Shpati region (who are Orthodox) revere Gjin and Gjon as separate saints, while linguists are unsure about the etymology of Gjin and whether or not it shares its origin with Gjon.

In the Middle Ages the name Gjon was very widespread in all Albanian regions. Until lately it was also prevalent among Arvanites in Greece

The name Gjon is also mentioned in the afterword of Gjon Buzuku's 1555 book, Meshari, where the author introduces himself to the reader as "Unë, dom Gjoni, biri i Bdek Buzukut" ("I, don Gjoni, son of Bdek Buzuku").

People with the given name Gjon
Gjon Françesku Albani (1720–1803), Italian cardinal of Albanian descent
Gjon Buzuku (1499–1577), Albanian writer
Gjon Delhusa (born 1953), Hungarian singer
Gjon Gazulli (1400–1465), Albanian scholar and diplomat
Gjon Kastrioti II (1456–1502), Albanian nobleman
Gjon Kastrioti (died 1437), Albanian nobleman
Gjon Markagjoni (1888–1966), Albanian clan leader
Gjon Mili (1904–1984), Albanian photographer
Gjon Muharremaj (born 1998), Swiss-Albanian singer
Gjon Muzaka, medieval Albanian noble of the Muzaka family and writer of his famous memoir
Gjon Ndoja (born 1991), Albanian basketball player
Gjon Progoni (died 1208), Albanian nobleman 
Gjon Simoni (1936–1999), Albanian musician
Gjon Zenebishi (died 1418), Albanian nobleman

People with the surname Gjonaj 
Adriana Gjonaj, Albanian politician
Algert Gjonaj (born 1987), Albanian basketball player
Etilda Gjonaj (born 1981), Albanian politician
Kujtim Gjonaj (born 1946), Albanian screenwriter
Mark Gjonaj, American politician
Salvador Gjonaj (born 1992), Albanian footballer

As surname 

Gjoni or Gjonaj is a common Albanian last name, from the given name Gjon. The names Joni and Jonima also have the same source, and the latter (under the modern Albanian form Gjonima) being the surname of members of the Jonima family. The Serbian language family name Đonović is derived from the first name Gjon which means that it is of Albanian origin.

History
The clan of Gjoni was first recorded in 1306. Originally Christian, it is shared between Albanian Christians and Muslims.

People with the surname Gjoni 
Simon Gjoni (1925-1991), Albanian composer
Dhimitër Gjoni, Nobleman
Xhelil Gjoni, Politician
Sadri Gjoni, Soccer player
Ilir Gjoni, Politician
Vladislav Gjoni, Nobleman
Ingrid Gjoni (born 1981), Albanian singer
Vilson Gjoni (born 1950), Croatian footballer
Sara Gjoni (born 1997), Miss Albania
Eron Gjoni, Programmer, 1st Amendment activist
Marka Gjoni  Kapedan of the Mirdita clan
Renne Gjoni Actor

As toponym 
Gjon, due to historic naming of places after the saint, became an element in Albanian toponyms, contributing to the formation of placenames such Shijon, Shinjan, Gjonm and Gjorm, the difference between the latter two demonstrating Tosk rhoticism.

See also 
 Jonima family
 Gjonaj
 Gjin

References

Sources
 

 https://web.archive.org/web/20120211183414/http://www.albanianhistory.net/texts15/AH1470.html

Albanian masculine given names
Albanian-language surnames